Magic Works is a series of magic tricks imported from Japan by Tenyo and distributed by Hasbro (Milton Bradley). Known in Japan as Magic-tainment (マジックテイナンド, Majikkuteimento), each trick in the series is packaged with an enclosed instruction book on how to perform it. Magic Works is billed on TV commercials as "no-fail magic [viewers] can master in minutes."

References

Magic tricks